KLOI-LP (102.9 FM) is a low-power FM radio station broadcasting a variety format. Licensed to Lopez Island, Washington, United States, the station serves the San Juan Islands area. The station is currently owned by The Gathering of Island Voices And Expressions.

See also
List of community radio stations in the United States

References

External links
 

LOI-LP
LOI-LP
Community radio stations in the United States